Jack Currie may refer to:
 Jack Currie (Australian footballer) (1915–1974), Australian rules footballer
 Jack Currie (English footballer) (born 2001) 
 Jack Currie (RAF officer) (1921–1996), officer in the Royal Air Force 
 John Allister Currie (1868–1931), Ontario author, journalist and political figure

See also
 John Currie (disambiguation)